The Buffalo Bulls baseball team was a varsity intercollegiate athletic team of the University at Buffalo in Amherst, New York, United States. From 2001 to 2017, the team was a member of the Mid-American Conference East division, which is part of the National Collegiate Athletic Association (NCAA) at the Division I level. The Bulls played their home games at Amherst Audubon Field on the UB campus. The Bulls were coached by Ron Torgalski for the program's final 11 seasons, from 2007 through 2017. At the conclusion of the 2017 season, the program was eliminated by the university.

History
The year 1949 is considered the official inaugural season of UB varsity baseball. But baseball’s start at UB goes back much further. There are newspaper accounts of a UB team from as early as 1894. From 1914–1917, several good UB teams took to the diamond playing some of the best teams in the country including Pitt, Army, Michigan State and Syracuse.

Year-by-year results

Bulls in Major League Baseball
The first Buffalo alumnus to appear in Major League Baseball was Bill Schuster, who debuted with the Pittsburgh Pirates in 1937. The most notable Bull from the pre-draft era was Eddie Basinski, who picked up 147 hits in 203 games with the Pirates and Brooklyn Dodgers between 1944 and 1947.

Since the Major League Baseball Draft began in 1965, Buffalo has had 33 players selected.

Joe Hesketh, a 1980 draftee of the Montreal Expos, accumulated a 9.0 WAR over eleven seasons as a left-handed pitcher from 1984 to 1994. Pitcher Steve Geltz played for the Bulls and was undrafted in 2008. He made his Major League debut in 2012 for the Los Angeles Angels.

References

 
Baseball teams established in 1916
Baseball teams disestablished in 2017
1916 establishments in New York (state)
2017 disestablishments in New York (state)